Florian Kraft (born 4 August 1998) is a German footballer who plays as a goalkeeper for SV Schermbeck.

Club career
Kraft made his professional debut for Fortuna Köln on 18 May 2019 in the 3. Liga in the 0–2 home loss against SG Sonnenhof Großaspach.

On 29 May 2020 it was confirmed, that Kraft would join SV Schermbeck for the 2020-21 season.

Career statistics

References

External links
 Profile at DFB.de
 Profile at kicker.de
 

1998 births
Living people
People from Marl, North Rhine-Westphalia
Sportspeople from Münster (region)
Footballers from North Rhine-Westphalia
German footballers
Germany youth international footballers
Association football goalkeepers
VfL Bochum players
SC Fortuna Köln players
SG Wattenscheid 09 players
Wuppertaler SV players
SV Schermbeck players
3. Liga players